The 1969 Swedish Open was a men's tennis tournament played on outdoor clay courts held in Båstad, Sweden. It was the 22nd edition of the tournament and was held from 7 July through 13 July 1969. Manuel Santana won the singles title.

Finals

Singles

 Manuel Santana defeated  Ion Țiriac 8–6, 6–4, 6–1

Doubles

 Ilie Năstase /  Ion Țiriac defeated  Manuel Orantes /  Manuel Santana

See also
 1969 Stockholm Open

References

External links
 Official tournament website

Swedish Open
Swedish Open
Swedish Open
July 1969 sports events in Europe